Juan Ignacio Duma (born 8 December 1993) is an Argentinian-born Chilean footballer who plays for Deportes Melipilla as a winger.

Career
He debuted on 9 September 2012 in a match against Santiago Wanderers during the 2012 Copa Chile. He played his first league match on 29 September in a match against Unión La Calera.

Career statistics

Club

References

External links

1993 births
Living people
Argentine footballers
Argentine expatriate footballers
Universidad de Chile footballers
Chilean Primera División players
Primera B de Chile players
Expatriate footballers in Chile
C.D. Huachipato footballers
Club Deportivo Palestino footballers
C.D. Antofagasta footballers
A.C. Barnechea footballers
Association football forwards
Naturalized citizens of Chile
Sportspeople from Buenos Aires Province